Laura McCabe (born March 8, 1966) is an American cross-country skier. She competed at the 1994 Winter Olympics and the 1998 Winter Olympics.

Personal life
Laura's daughter, Novie, represented the United States at the 2022 Winter Olympics in the 10 kilometre classical.

Cross-country skiing results
All results are sourced from the International Ski Federation (FIS).

Olympic Games

World Cup

Season standings

References

External links
 

1966 births
Living people
American female cross-country skiers
Olympic cross-country skiers of the United States
Cross-country skiers at the 1994 Winter Olympics
Cross-country skiers at the 1998 Winter Olympics
Sportspeople from Bozeman, Montana
21st-century American women